The men's singles luge competition at the 1980 Winter Olympics in Lake Placid was held from 13 to 16 February, at Mt. Van Hoevenberg Olympic Bobsled Run.

Results

References

Luge at the 1980 Winter Olympics
Luge